The Christian Democratic Party (PDC) was a Spanish Christian democratic political party, founded in 1977. The leaders of the PDC were Fernando Álvarez de Miranda and Íñigo Cavero.

History
The party was founded through the merge of the Spanish Democratic Union (UDE) and the Christian Democratic People's Party (PPDC), along with some independents. The party joined the Union of the Democratic Centre (UCD) electoral coalition for the 1977 Spanish general election, gaining 17 seats in the Congress of Deputies, officially merging into the UCD as a unitary party in December 1977 and dissolving itself in February 1978.

References

Conservative parties in Spain
1977 establishments in Spain
1978 disestablishments in Spain
Political parties established in 1977
Political parties disestablished in 1978